The  Saraç Mosque or Kukli Mehmet Bey Mosque is a cultural heritage monument, one of the oldest mosques not only in Prizren but in all of Kosovo.

History 

The Kukli Bey Mosque lies near city center in the Saraçhane Quarter, historically known for the tanning and gristmill trades. The mosque is located near the Halveti Teqe and the Gazi Mehmet Pasha Hammam (Turkish bath). In 1531, it was built by Mehmet Kukli Bey, then governor of a region stretching from Thessalonica to Bosnia. The southwestern-facing porch was demolished in 1963 during road widening. 1977 and 1994 renovations plastered the interior walls and removed the murals, while the stone roof was replaced with clay tile; more renovations were done from 2000 to 2003. In 2008, the porch was rebuilt, but the interior burned in an electrical fire in 2009.

Description 
The mosque is a 9 x 9 m square built from stone mortared with lime. An externally hexagonal roof originally built from stone slabs is layered above an octagonal interior dome underneath. The façade plaster shows clearly the masonry structure, in which irregular river stones are bound by lime mortar. Wooden hatches connecting the façade to the central structure are also visible, as is an entry door on the southwestern side. The door is wooden with a semi-arched frame of carved stone, and a nearby sign identifies the mihrab. In the southern corner, close to the door, is the hexagonal-based stone minaret, a rounded structure topped by a conical kylah or dome on top of the şerefe or balcony, the latter covered in rich geometric ornamentation.

References 

Mosques in Prizren
Ottoman mosques in Kosovo
Monuments and memorials in Kosovo
Cultural heritage monuments in Prizren District